Brian Austin de Bruijn (born September 4, 1954) is a former Dutch-Canadian ice hockey player. He played for the Netherlands men's national ice hockey team at the 1980 Winter Olympics in Lake Placid.

References

External links

1954 births
Living people
Ice hockey players at the 1980 Winter Olympics
Olympic ice hockey players of the Netherlands
Dutch ice hockey forwards
De Bruijn, Brian
De Bruijn, Brian
Heerenveen Flyers players
Nijmegen Tigers players
Tilburg Trappers players
Canadian people of Dutch descent